Jalston Demontrez Fowler Sr. (born July 26, 1990) is a former American football fullback. He played college football at Alabama, and was drafted by the Tennessee Titans in the fourth round of the 2015 NFL Draft.

Early years
Fowler was a four-star running back out of Vigor High School in Prichard, Alabama. In 2008, he rushed for 1,182 yards and 25 touchdowns, and also caught 27 passes for 391 yards and a score, leading his team to the 5A Alabama State Championship. For his efforts, he was an Alabama Sports Writers Association Class 5A All-State selection. As a senior in 2009, he was named a Birmingham News Super Senior and was named All-American at running back by SuperPrep.

Fowler also participated in track & field at Vigor, posting personal-best times of 11.86 seconds in the 100-meter dash and 24.18 seconds in the 200-meter dash as a senior. He was also a starter on the basketball team.

Fowler was listed as the No. 2 fullback nationally by Scout.com. He was rated as the No. 9 player in the state of Alabama by SuperPrep. He was No. 10 on The Mobile Press-Register's Elite 18 and No. 97 in the publication's Super Southeast 120. Tom Lemming ranked him as the No. 20 fullback in the nation. He enrolled at Alabama in January 2010 to get a head start in spring practice.

Professional career

Tennessee Titans
Fowler was drafted by the Tennessee Titans in the fourth round with the 108th overall pick of the 2015 NFL Draft. On September 27, 2015, he recorded his first career professional touchdown on a one-yard rush in the fourth quarter of a 35–33 loss to the Indianapolis Colts.

On September 17, 2017, in Week 2, he recorded his second career touchdown, a three-yard rush in the fourth quarter, in a 37–16 victory over the Jacksonville Jaguars. On December 9, 2017, Fowler was waived by the Titans.

Seattle Seahawks
On December 12, 2017, Fowler was signed to the Seattle Seahawks' practice squad. He signed a reserve/future contract with the Seahawks on January 3, 2018. He was waived by the Seahawks on August 12, 2018.

Atlanta Falcons
On August 20, 2018, Fowler signed with the Atlanta Falcons. He was waived on September 1, 2018.

Tennessee Titans (second stint)
On October 29, 2018, Fowler was re-signed by the Tennessee Titans. Instead of wearing his original jersey number of 45, he switched to number 40. Fowler was inactive for his first game back with the Titans in Week 9. He was released on November 13, 2018 after being inactive for his first two games back.

Career statistics

Personal life
Fowler has two sons, Jalston, Jr. and Jayce. He is married to BreShawn Fowler. They were married February 17, 2019. Fowler graduated with a degree in human environmental science from Alabama in 2013 and received his master's degree in sports management from Alabama in 2015. His brother, Joe, was accidentally shot and killed at a friend’s house in 2007.

References

External links
 Alabama Crimson Tide bio
 Tennessee Titans bio 

1990 births
Living people
Alabama Crimson Tide football players
American football fullbacks
Atlanta Falcons players
Players of American football from Alabama
Seattle Seahawks players
Sportspeople from Mobile, Alabama
Tennessee Titans players